Sauvo is a municipality of Finland. It is located in the Southwest Finland region.

Like many waterside areas near major population centres, Sauvo's population increases every summer because of summer cottage usage. While vacationers are not reflected in the official statistics, they roughly double the population during the summer. Today it holds a stone church from the late 15th century, and many manor houses.

The municipality is unilingually Finnish.

History 
Sauvo is home to a number of archaeological finds from the Iron Age. The first written mention of Sauvo dates back to the year of 1335.

The municipality of Karuna was merged into Sauvo in the year of 1969.

Notable persons 
 Aatos Tapala, opera singer and actor
 Arno Jaatinen, Jäger major
 Arto Nuotio, singer
 Arvo Korsimo, politician
Eero Rislakki, industrial engineer
 Esko Kiviranta, politician
 John Rosenbröijer, Jäger trooper
 Jorma Rinne, athlete
 Petri Laaksonen, musician
 Rami Sarmasto, actor and musician
 Sanna Perkiö, politician
 Veikko Palomaa, writer

Gallery

References

External links

Municipality of Sauvo – Official website